The South Caucasus Pipeline (also known as Baku–Tbilisi–Erzurum Pipeline, BTE pipeline, or Shah Deniz Pipeline) is a natural gas pipeline from the Shah Deniz gas field in the Azerbaijan sector of the Caspian Sea to Turkey. It runs parallel to the Baku–Tbilisi–Ceyhan pipeline (oil).

History
On 21 May 2006, the commissioning gas was pumped to the pipeline from the Sangachal Terminal.  First deliveries through the pipeline commenced on 30 September 2006.  Deliveries of gas from Shah Deniz gas field started on 15 December 2006.

On 12 August 2008, the pipeline operator BP closed the pipeline for safety reasons because of the South Ossetia conflict. Gas supplies were resumed on 14 August 2008.

Description
The  diameter gas pipeline runs through the same corridor as the Baku–Tbilisi–Ceyhan pipeline until Erzurum, where BTC turns south to the Mediterranean.

Economic impact
The first aim of the pipeline is to supply Turkey and Georgia. As a transit country, Georgia has rights to take 5% of the annual gas flow through the pipeline in lieu of a tariff and can purchase a further  of gas a year at a discounted price. It supplies Europe with Caspian natural gas through the Southern Gas Corridor pipelines, through the Trans Adriatic Pipeline and Trans-Anatolian gas pipeline.

Project company
The pipeline is owned by the South Caucasus Pipeline Company, a consortium led by BP. As of 2022, the shareholders of the consortium are:
BP (UK) 29.99%
Lukoil (Russia) 19.99%
TPAO (Turkey) 19.00%
SOCAR (Azerbaijan) 14.35%
NICO (Iran) 10.00%
SGC Upstream (Azerbaijan) 6.67%

The technical operator of the pipeline is BP and the commercial operator was Statoil. According to the PSA agreement, the commercial operatorship of the SCP was transferred to SOCAR starting on 1 January 2015.

South Caucasus Pipeline expansion (SCPx)
As a part of the Shah Deniz Full Field Development (FFD), otherwise called the Shahdeniz-2 project, BP will expand the pipeline through capacity extension by putting two additional compressor stations in Georgia and Turkey. This will almost triple the current transportation capacity of the pipeline up to 20 bcm/year.  

This capacity increase would be able to accommodate an additional 16 bcm gas coming from the SD-2 project.

See also

Baku–Tbilisi–Ceyhan pipeline
Nabucco Pipeline
Shah Deniz gas field
Trans-Caspian Gas Pipeline
Southern Gas Corridor
TANAP
Energy in Georgia (country)

Footnotes

References
International Energy Agency: Caspian oil and gas: The supply potential of Central Asia and Transcaucasia. OECD, Paris 1998, 
Charles van der Leeuw: Oil and gas in the Caucasus & Caspian: A history. Curzon, Richmond, Surrey 2000, 
John Roberts: Caspian oil and gas: How far have we come and where are we going? In: Oil, transition and security in Central Asia. RoutledgeCurzon, London [u.a.] 2003,

External links
BP's South Caucasus Pipeline website
Baku-Tbilisi-Ceyhan / South Caucasus pipelines environmental and community investments website
Articles about the Southern gas corridor and the energy issue of the South Caucasus in the Caucasus Analytical Digest No. 3
 South Caucasus Gas Pipeline on Global Energy Monitor

Energy infrastructure completed in 2006
Natural gas pipelines in Azerbaijan
Natural gas pipelines in Georgia (country)
Natural gas pipelines in Turkey
BP buildings and structures
Equinor
Azerbaijan–Turkey relations
Caspian Sea
Caucasus
Azerbaijan–Georgia (country) relations
Georgia (country)–Turkey relations